Nói Snaehólm Ólafsson (born 3 July 1994) is an Icelandic footballer who last played for Senica as a defender.

Club career
Snaehólm Ólafsson made his Fortuna Liga debut for Senica against MŠK Žilina on 8 August 2020. Senica lost the first round fixture at OMS Arena through four second half goals by Dávid Ďuriš, Jakub Paur and Vahan Bichakhchyan. Ólafsson completed the entirety of the match.

References

External links
 FK Senica official club profile 
 
 Futbalnet profile 
 

1994 births
Living people
Noi Snaeholm Olafsson
Noi Snaeholm Olafsson
Association football defenders
BKV Norrtälje players
IK Frej players
Nyköpings BIS players
Syrianska FC players
FK Senica players
Superettan players
Ettan Fotboll players
Slovak Super Liga players
Expatriate footballers in Sweden
Expatriate footballers in Slovakia
Noi Snaeholm Olafsson
Noi Snaeholm Olafsson